This is a list of all managers of Konyaspor, including honours.

Managers

Records

Nationalities

Most games managed

References

External links
Official website